The Women's 3000 metres steeplechase event at the 2013 European Athletics U23 Championships was held in Tampere, Finland, at Ratina Stadium on 13 July.

Medalists

Results

Final
13 July 2013 

Intermediate times:
1000m: 3:12.56 Gesa-Felicitas Krause 
2000m: 6:27.88 Gesa-Felicitas Krause

Participation
According to an unofficial count, 12 athletes from 9 countries participated in the event.

References

3000 metres steeplechasechase
Steeplechase at the European Athletics U23 Championships